Mill Creek Valley was a historic neighborhood located in the central corridor between 20th Street and Saint Louis University in St. Louis, Missouri. European settlement began in the 18th century with mills established along La Petite Rivière, now known as Mill Creek. It became an industrial and railroad center in the 19th century. Union Station was opened in 1894. The building was closed in 1978 and renovated for commercial use. Also a residential and commercial center, Mill Creek Valley was populated by German immigrants and African Americans, before and after the Civil War. More people moved into the area during World War II to support the war effort.

An urban renewal project of the late 1950s razed most of the residential dwellings, commercial buildings and churches. Although the intention was to establish a prospering commercial and residential area, the Saint Louis University and Harris–Stowe State University (HSSU) command much of the former Mill Creek Valley land. 

Notable residents include Lucy A. Delaney (c. 1828–1830 – 1910), who wrote about winning her suit for freedom and became a community leader. Also, General William Tecumseh Sherman (1820–1891) who served the Union Army during the American Civil War, and Josephine Baker (1906–1975), an American-born French entertainer, French Resistance agent, and civil rights activist. Another was Erskine Oglesby (1937–2004), an American tenor saxophonist and blues singer.

History

Millpond period

Among the initial settlers of St. Louis were Joseph and Roger Taillons, who were millers. Joseph settled along La Petite Rivière and built a grist mill and a dam along present-day Eighth Street. The creek, later named Mill Creek, ran along what is now Vandeventer Avenue to the Mississippi River. Taillon's mill was not large enough to make sufficient flour for the community. Pierre Laclède paid Taillon four hundred livres in cash for the mill and he built a larger mill and raised the dam. Laclède was granted 1,000 acres along the creek on August 11, 1766. 

In 1770, Laclède entered into a contract with the Spanish government to supply bread to visiting Native Americans. After his death, the property was sold to Auguste Chouteau. Chouteau's grist mill was located along the creek south of present-day Clark Street. Chouteau's Pond was a local attraction.  Other water-powered and horse-powered mills were established in the area; they were the first industrial plants in St. Louis.

Growth due to westward expansion
By 1849, the Missouri Republican newspaper estimated that one-third of the city's population were emigrants. During the California Gold Rush, up to 800 emigrants arrived in St. Louis, bound for the western territory. People that stayed in St. Louis found that housing was limited and many stayed in slums. Without garbage collection and sewers, the city became increasingly polluted and unhealthy. A cholera epidemic spread throughout the city in the spring of 1849, essentially suspending business, church, school, and judicial activities. Two-thirds of the people who lived near Chouteau's pond, the filthiest area in the city, died of the disease by July 3. There was talk of draining the pond and installing a sewer system, which was weighed against voter's predilection for low taxes and apathy for the conditions of the poorest people in the city. After a mass protest, a 12-person Committee of Public Health was established, led by Edward Bates (later United States Attorney General under President Abraham Lincoln). The powerful committee enforced sanitation ordinances, by removing waste, providing clean water, providing health care for the ill, ensuring residents disinfected their homes, and removing the dead for burial. Chouteau's Pond was drained due to cholera epidemics and pollution in 1852.

Railroads

About that time, railroads lines were established from St. Louis to the western frontier. Mill Creek Valley became a combination of residential and industrial section of the city, with factories and railroad yards, reflecting the city's continued growth as a transportation hub and an industrial center. Depots, roundhouses, bridges over railroad tracks, and many warehouses were built in Mill Creek Valley to support the railroad industry in St. Louis.

In 1892, construction began for a 42 acre (17 ha) railroad site and a new railroad terminal designed and supervised by Theodore C. Link. Remnants of the millpond period—log cabins, hulls of boats, and willow stumps were removed—and deep caves and vaults from an old brewery were extracted. Union Station was opened in 1894. It had 32 railroad lines for multiple railroad company and the largest train shed in the world at the time. The station operated until 1978, when it was renovated for commercial space.

Residential and commercial growth
The area was populated by German immigrants who moved into the valley during the 19th century. African Americans settled in the area, some of whom were free and others had escaped enslavement. After the Civil War (1861–1865), poor blacks moved north from southern cotton fields to Mill Creek Valley.

World War I and II
During World War I (1914–1918) and World War II (1939–1945), there was a surge in the number of people that came to the city to work for the war effort. During World War I, there was a 41% increase in African American residents. By World War II, there were nearly 20,000 residents, most of whom were Black.

African American community

Mill Creek Valley became one of the largest African American communities in the first half of the 20th century. Black businesses and organizations thrived. Mill Creek Valley, spanning 465 acres, was the home to hundreds of businesses and organizations, 5,600 residential buildings, and 43 historic churches in the 1950s. One of the Black businesses was the People's Finance Corporation Building. Notable educational facilities were the Booker T. Washington Vocational School, and the original Vashon High School. City Hospital #2 was established in the valley. 

The YWCA, Phillis Wheatley Branch was a center of intellectual life in the Mill Creek Valley neighborhood. The Fisk Jubilee Singers performed at Wheatley in 1916, and W.E.B. Du Bois gave a lecture in 1922. Maya Angelou, Mary McLeod Bethune and Butterfly McQueen all visited or stayed in the YWCA's hotel rooms. 

Bars and nightclubs were established. Residents Josephine Baker and Scott Joplin attained worldwide fame.  The community developed a distinctive culture based upon African American music, religion and activism. It became a center for racial justice activism.

Redlining and segregation caused the neighborhood to degrade. It had a lack of water and electricity. Buildings deteriorated and the area was unsanitary. Of the dwellings, 80 percent did not have bathrooms within the house and 50 percent of the houses did not have running water. The neighborhood was considered the worst eyesore in the city, yet there were successful businesses and was one of the key African American neighborhoods.

Urban renewal project

The Housing Act of 1954 was enacted to fund urban renewal projects across the country. Mayor Raymond R. Tucker announced his plans on  August 7, 1954 to demolish the buildings to allow for new development. In 1955, voters of the City of St. Louis passed a $110 million bond issue, of which $10 million was delegated for the demolition of Mill Creek Valley. The urban renewal project also constructed residential buildings, created industrial zones, and built new highways, including U.S. Highway 40. It was the nation's largest urban-renewal project at the time.

About 20,000 African American residents were displaced before it was leveled for an urban renewal project that began in 1959. Harris–Stowe State University (HSSU) incorporated the old Vashon High School, one of the few buildings that was spared demolition, into its campus. Saint Louis University and HSSU now cover much of the former historic area. HSSU unveiled a mural for the campus in February 2018 that was Wells Fargo commissioned in honor of Mill Creek Valley. The Grand Tower of Council Plaza, Grand Forest, and Laclede Park apartments provide residential housing.

Repercussions
As was true with a number of urban renewal projects in the United States, "federal funds were used to systematically discriminate against African Americans and hinder their progress." More than 40 churches, hundreds of businesses and organizations, and thousands of residential buildings, many of them with historical significance, were destroyed. It was one of the key African American neighborhoods and its residents were displaced from their community and social networks.

Notable residents
 Josephine Baker (1906–1975), an American-born French entertainer, French Resistance agent, and civil rights activist.
 Lucy A. Delaney (c. 1828–1830 – 1910), was an African-American woman that during her years of freedom was a seamstress, slave narrator, and community leader.
 Erskine Oglesby (1937–2004), an American tenor saxophonist and blues singer.
 General William Tecumseh Sherman (1820–1891), served the Union Army during the American Civil War
 Walt Whitman (1819–1892), was an American poet, essayist and journalist who visited his brother, owner of the Daily Missouri Republican

See also
 1896 St. Louis–East St. Louis tornado
 Eads Bridge
 Graham Paper Company
 Pacific Railroad
 Peacock Alley (jazz club)
 St. Mary of Victories Church
 Destruction of Veiled Prophet Den in Mill Creek Valley

Notes

References

Further reading
 
 
 
 
 
 

Neighborhoods in St. Louis
Urban renewal